Tel Arza is a Hareidi neighborhood in northern Jerusalem. It is bordered by Ezrat Torah on the west, Shikun Chabad on the south, the Bukharim quarter on the east, and Sanhedria on the north.

Tel Arza was established in 1931, as part of the expansion experienced in the Old Yishuv while recovering from the 1929 Palestine riots.

Its name is taken from the Mishna, where it is described as a place where Jews were murdered.

References

Neighbourhoods of Jerusalem